Bruceiella wareni is a species of sea snail, a marine gastropod mollusk in the family Skeneidae.

The specific name wareni is in honor of Swedish malacologist Anders Warén.Bruceiella Wareni

Distribution

The type locality is the Kairei hydrothermal vent site on the Central Indian Ridge, just north of the Rodrigues Triple Point.

Description
The width of the shell is 1.6-2.2 mm.

References

External links
 

wareni
Gastropods described in 2004